The Race Relations Acts are a series of statutes enacted by the Parliament of the United Kingdom to address racial discrimination.

They are:
 The Race Relations Act 1965
 The Race Relations Act 1968 
 The Race Relations Act 1976
 The Race Relations Amendment Act 2000

See also
 Equality Act (disambiguation)